Rajadurai is a 1993 Indian Tamil language action drama film, directed by S. A. Chandrasekhar and produced by A. S. Ibrahim Ravuthar. The film stars Vijayakanth, Jayasudha, Sivaranjani and R. Sundarrajan. It was released on 16 September 1993.

Plot 
Rajadurai (Vijayakanth), an honest police officer arrests and humiliates Mayandi (Anandaraj) who swears revenge. Once out of the prison, he kidnap's Rajadurai's son Vijay. He later brings him up as Arun along with his own son in such a way that Vijay would do anything for him. In fact, Mayandi uses him as a weapon against his own father.

Years later, Mayandi who has taken the name of Manohar is a large kingpin; a wolf in sheep's clothing who has a great influence in the government. Rajadurai is transferred to this area to control the crimes. His wife, Uma (Jayasudha), spots an injured Vijay and recognizes him as her long lost son and takes him to the hospital from where he manages to escape from the police in pursuit. Later Rajadurai confronts his son when he tries to smuggle goods illegally as per Manohar's instructions. Rajadurai brutally beats his son when he refuses to reveal the truth. Manohar uses the situation to develop inside Vijay a grudge against Rajadurai.

Later Vijay is married to a crook, Suriya (Sivaranjani) and Rajadurai is made the chief escort for the minister who is the main guest by Manohar humiliating the officer. After marriage the couple is asked by Manohar to stay in Rajadurai's house. Though Uma welcomes them wholeheartedly, Rajadurai is suspicious and pretends to accept them. Suriya reforms and later turns against her own husband when he criticizes his own parents. Again a part of Manohar's game, Rajadurai and Uma leaves their house. Uma whose health worsens asks her husband to bring Vijay as her last wish. However, Manohar refuses to send him due to which Rajadurai is forced to act as Vijay to fulfill his wife's wish. But his identity is revealed and Uma dies instantly, heartbroken.

Having enough Rajadurai sets out to nab Manohar and his son. At the last moment, Vijay understands his mistake and kills Manohar with the help of his father after which he surrenders.

Cast 

Vijayakanth as DCP Rajadurai/Vijay Kumar "Vijay" (Arun) in dual roles
Jayasudha as Uma
Sivaranjani as Suriya
R. Sundarrajan
Anandaraj as Mayandi (Manohar)
Srihari
Thalapathy Dinesh
Bhanupriya in a Special Appearance
Major Sundarrajan in Guest Appearance
V. Gopalakrishnan in Guest Appearance
Peeli Sivam
Vellai Subbaiah
Karuppu Subbiah
Thiraineethi Selvam
Kaaja

Soundtrack 
The music was composed by Deva.

Reception 
Malini Mannath of The Indian Express wrote, ".. the story being a rehash of earlier ones, the screenplay full of gaps and actor not quite carrying off the double role, the film [..] is a disappointment". C. R. K. of Kalki said that, despite the son character being too similar to Vijayakanth's earlier roles, the actor showed new acting dimensions in his performance as the father.

References

External links 
 

1990s Tamil-language films
1993 films
Films directed by S. A. Chandrasekhar
Films scored by Deva (composer)